Qaaqaait Al Jisr    is a village in the Nabatieh District in southern Lebanon.

History
In  the 1596 tax records, it was named as a village,  Qa'qayit an-Nahr, in the Ottoman nahiya (subdistrict) of Sagif under the liwa' (district) of Safad, with a population of  40  households, all Muslim. The villagers paid a fixed  tax-rate of 25 %  on  agricultural products, such as wheat, barley, fruit trees, goats and beehives, in addition to  "occasional revenues" and a press for olive oil or grape syrup; a total of 3,695 akçe.

References

Bibliography

External links
 Qaaqaiyeh Ej Jisr, Localiban

Populated places in Nabatieh District